Brad Parker (born 19 February 1997) is an Australian professional rugby league footballer who plays as a  and er for the Manly Warringah Sea Eagles in the NRL.

He has played for the Prime Minister's XIII.

Background
Parker was born in the Northern Beaches of Sydney, New South Wales, Australia.

He played his junior rugby league for the Manly Christian Brothers, before being signed by the Manly Warringah Sea Eagles.

Playing career

Early career
In 2015 and 2016, Parker played for the Manly-Warringah Sea Eagles' NYC team. On 18 August 2015, he re-signed with Manly on a two-year contract until the end of 2017.

2016
In round 19 of the 2016 NRL season, Parker made his NRL debut for Manly-Warringah against the New Zealand Warriors.  Parker got both his first and second try in the round 24 clash with the Melbourne Storm at Brookvale Oval.

2017
On the August 8, 2017, Parker signed a new deal with the club keeping him there till the end of 2019.“Manly is the team want to stay at, it’s the team I have gone for my whole life,” Parker said. Parker injured himself in the round 24 clash with the Wests Tigers. Results of the scan revealed Parker has a lateral meniscus tear suffered in the loss at Leichhardt Oval. Parker sat out for the rest of the season with the injury. In the 2017 season Parker played 4 games scoring 1 try with the Manly Warringah Sea Eagles.

2018
Parker made 17 appearances for Manly in 2018 as the club narrowly avoided the wooden spoon by 2 competition points.

2019
Parker made 19 appearances for Manly in the 2019 NRL season as the club finished in sixth place and qualified for the finals.  Parker scored a try in Manly's elimination final victory over Cronulla in week one of the finals series at Brookvale Oval.  The following week in the elimination semi final, Parker scored a try but was later sin binned for tripping a South Sydney player in the club's 34-26 loss at ANZ Stadium.

On 30 September, Parker earned his first representative jersey as he was named at Centre for the Australia PM XIII side. On 7 October, Parker was named in the U23 Junior Australian side.

2020
Parker played 19 games in the 2020 NRL season.  Manly missed out on the finals finishing a disappointing 13th on the table.

2021
In round 11 of the 2021 NRL season, Parker scored two tries for Manly-Warringah in a 28-6 victory over Parramatta.
In round 14 against North Queensland, Parker scored two tries for Manly in a 50-18 victory.
Parker played 25 games for Manly in the 2021 NRL season including the club's preliminary final loss against South Sydney.

2022
In round 8 of the 2022 NRL season, Parker was taken from the field during Manly's 40-22 loss against South Sydney.  It was later revealed Parker would be ruled out for an indefinite period with an ACL injury.

References

External links

Manly Sea Eagles profile
Manly Warringah Sea Eagles profile

1997 births
Australian rugby league players
Manly Warringah Sea Eagles players
Rugby league centres
Rugby league wingers
Living people
Rugby league players from Sydney